The Shaw Center for the Arts is a 125,000 square foot (12,000 m²) performing art venue, fine arts museum, and education center located at 100 Lafayette Street in downtown Baton Rouge, Louisiana. It opened in 2005. The Center includes the LSU Museum of Art, the LSU School of Art Glassell Gallery, the 325-seat Manship Theatre, classrooms, Tsunami, a rooftop sushi restaurant, and a park. Among other collections, the museum includes the largest assemblage of Newcomb Pottery in the United States.

The skin of the Shaw Center for the Arts is made of translucent channel glass manufactured in Germany by Glasfabrik Lamberts. The Shaw Center received the American Institute of Architects Gulf States Honor Award in 2005 for its "aggressive concept with a good contrast of materials" and "effective mapping of façade upon the plaza" .

The center was built with both public and private funding. The Shaw Group was a major donor to Shaw Center for the Arts, and received the naming rights to the building, however the Shaw Center is neither owned by The Shaw Group nor do they share employees. Other major donors were the Manship families, the Pennington families and Lamar Advertising, which is based in Baton Rouge (Lamar and Reilly families).

The Shaw Center has won several awards for design excellence including: 
 2008 American Institute of Architects (AIA) National Honor Award
 2005 AIA Gulf States Region Honor Award
 2005 AIA New England Region Honor Award
 2005 Boston Society of Architects Award for Design
 2005 Boston Society of Architects Higher Education Award Citation

The architects are
 Design Architect: Schwartz/Silver Architects, Boston, MA
 Executive Architect: Eskew+Dumez+Ripple, New Orleans, LA
 Associated Architect: Jerry M. Campbell & Associates, Baton Rouge, LA

LSU Museum of Art
The LSU Museum of Art opened in March 2005. The museum collection includes a diverse art collection, changing exhibitions, education programs, and special events.

LSU School of Art Glassell Gallery
The Alfred C. Glassell Jr. Exhibition Gallery at the Shaw Center for the Arts is the LSU School of Art's exhibition space. Visitors can view works by contemporary artists from around the country, follow the development of LSU School of Art students, and see the most recent work of School of Art faculty.

Manship Theatre
The Manship Theatre is a 325-seat performing arts theater used for concerts, theater performances, musicals, dance recitals and films.

See also 
 List of concert halls
 List of music venues
 Theatre in Louisiana

References

 Russel, A. (2005, May). Low rider. In Architecture, 94, 52–57.
 "AIArchitect, July 11, 2005 - AIA Gulf States Honor 11 Stunning Works"

External links
 

Louisiana State University buildings and structures
Arts centers in Louisiana
Art museums and galleries in Louisiana
Concert halls in Louisiana
Museums in Baton Rouge, Louisiana
Music venues in Louisiana
Performing arts centers in Louisiana
Theatres in Louisiana
University museums in Louisiana
Tourist attractions in Baton Rouge, Louisiana